William John Henry Boetcker (1873–1962) was an American religious leader and influential public speaker.

Born in Hamburg, Germany, he was ordained a Presbyterian minister soon after his arrival in the United States as a young adult.  The Rev. Boetcker was ordained in Brooklyn, New York.

He quickly gained attention as an outspoken opponent of organized labor and was instrumental in the founding of the Citizens Industrial Association, later making a professional career of public speaking, and is sometimes considered the forerunner of such contemporary "success coaches" as Anthony Robbins.

He is widely credited with coining the phrase, "A man is judged by the company he keeps, and a company is judged by the men it keeps, and the people of Democratic nations are judged by the type and caliber of officers they elect.”

The Ten Cannots
An outspoken political conservative, Rev. Boetcker is perhaps best remembered for his authorship of a pamphlet entitled The Ten Cannots, originally published in 1916, that emphasizes freedom and responsibility of the individual on himself.  It is often misattributed to Abraham Lincoln.  The error apparently stems from a leaflet printed in 1942 by a conservative political organization called the Committee for Constitutional Government.  The leaflet bore the title "Lincoln on Limitations" and contained some genuine Lincoln quotations on one side and the "Ten Cannots" on the other, with the attributions switched.  The mistake of crediting Lincoln for "The Ten Cannots" has been repeated, notably by Ronald Reagan in his address to the 1992 Republican National Convention in Houston, and by John Kasich on Fox News Sunday in 2015.

There are several minor variants of the pamphlet in circulation, but the most commonly accepted version appears below:

You cannot bring about prosperity by discouraging thrift.
You cannot strengthen the weak by weakening the strong.
You cannot help little men by tearing down big men.
You cannot lift the wage earner by pulling down the wage payer.
You cannot help the poor by destroying the rich.
You cannot establish sound security on borrowed money.
You cannot further the brotherhood of man by inciting class hatred.
You cannot keep out of trouble by spending more than you earn.
You cannot build character and courage by destroying men's initiative and independence.
And you cannot help men permanently by doing for them what they can and should do for themselves.

Boetcker also spoke of the "Seven National Crimes":

I don't think.
I don't know.
I don't care.
I am too busy.
I leave well enough alone.
I have no time to read and find out.
I am not interested.

References

External links
William J. H. Boetcker Manuscript Collection at Princeton Theological Seminary Library.

1873 births
1962 deaths
American Presbyterians
German emigrants to the United States